José Antonio Gómez Urrutia (born December 18, 1953) is a Chilean lawyer, Social Democrat Radical Party politician, and a former senator and president of his party. He is the former Minister of Defense and former Minister of Justice in the second Michelle Bachelet government.

References

External links

Members of the Senate of Chile
Chilean agnostics
Chilean people of Basque descent
People from Santiago
Living people
Radical Social Democratic Party of Chile politicians
1953 births
Candidates for President of Chile
Liceo Gregorio Cordovez alumni
University of Chile alumni
Instituto Nacional General José Miguel Carrera alumni
Chilean Ministers of Defense
Chilean Ministers of Justice
20th-century Chilean lawyers